Cody Norman Hawkins (born March 24, 1988) is an American college football coach and a former professional and college football player. He is the head football coach at Idaho State University. Hawkins played as a quarterback for the Colorado Buffaloes and professionally in Sweden for the Stockholm Mean Machines in the Superserien league for two seasons. He is son of UC Davis head coach Dan Hawkins.

High school
Hawkins never lost playing football while growing up, going 59–0 since beginning in sixth grade. He also lettered twice in basketball in high school.

In Boise, Idaho, Hawkins led Bishop Kelly High School to back-to-back undefeated state championships. He was also a two-time Idaho Statesman All-Idaho Football Team Player of the Year. In 2005, he threw for 42 touchdowns and 2,783 yards with 5 interceptions, earning him the 2005 Gatorade Idaho Player of the Year award. As a junior in 2004, he had 31 touchdowns and 8 interceptions for the Knights.

Hawkins was a highly touted prospect, and had official offers from Colorado, Boise State, Brigham Young, Oregon,  and Louisiana–Lafayette, but only made official visits to Boise State and Colorado. More colleges were not interested because of his small size. He was an EA Sports Elite 11 quarterback (#4).

Hawkins was on a reality show called ESPNU Summer House, located in the Lincoln Park district in Chicago in 2006.

His father Dan was the head coach at Boise State and had offered him a scholarship to play there, which he accepted. However, when his father switched jobs to be the head coach at Colorado, he again offered his son a scholarship to play there. Cody Hawkins kept his decision on where to play until National Signing Day and even had signed both letters of intent (LOI). He surprised his father when he faxed in his LOI to Colorado, thus picking Colorado over Boise State. His father would later say, "I really didn’t know what he was going to do" about the surprise.

College

2006
Hawkins redshirted for 2006, and was selected for the Offensive Scout Award by his teammates for the season.

2007
Heading into spring and fall practices in 2007, there was considerable discussion about who would be the starting quarterback for the season. The previous year's starter, Bernard Jackson, was still with the team, but was not considered the favorite to earn the position. Hawkins' competition, Nick Nelson, was a junior college transfer to the team. Because of the conflict of interest, his father had publicly stated he would leave the starting quarterback decision to the offensive coordinator, Mark Helfrich. The decision was not made until two weeks before the first game of the season.

This was the 20th time a coach would coach his own son at quarterback in NCAA Division I college football, the ninth son to be a starter.

Hawkins led the team to a 6–7 record for 2007, including the Independence Bowl against the Alabama Crimson Tide.

He set the Colorado record for most pass attempts (424) and 2nd most completions (239).

2008
Hawkins was, according to some, not automatically a lock to be the starter for the 2008 season. Aside from continuing competition from Nick Nelson, Matt Ballenger was coming off of his redshirt season.

2009
After poor performances in the first four games of the 2009 season, Hawkins was replaced as the starter by Tyler Hansen on October 10 against Texas.

Statistics
Colorado does not recognize bowl games as part of the statistics. However, the NCAA does and the information is available. His 2007 stats including the bowl game are available here.

After college
In 2010, Hawkins accepted an offer to play professionally for the Stockholm Mean Machines of the Swedish Superserien league for two seasons. He was also named the quarterback for the US national team for the 2011 IFAF World Cup and as the quarterbacks coach for the same team, serving under his father, in the 2015 IFAF World Cup. In 2017, he joined the UC Davis Aggies, again serving under his father, and was subsequently promoted to assistant director of football operations and recruiting.

Personal
Hawkins is one of four siblings. His oldest sister, Ashley, lives in Portland, Oregon, and works for Nike, and his other sister, Britney is married to Tim Brady, who played at Boise State. His younger brother Drew played football at Boise State. Father Dan played collegiately at UC Davis as a fullback, and was named head coach at Colorado in December 2005.

References

External links

 Colorado profile
 ESPN Summer House profile

1988 births
Living people
American football quarterbacks
Colorado Buffaloes football players
Idaho State Bengals football coaches
Ohio State Buckeyes football coaches
UC Davis Aggies football coaches
High school football coaches in Oregon
Participants in American reality television series
Sportspeople from Boise, Idaho
Coaches of American football from Idaho
Players of American football from Idaho
People from Woodland, California
American expatriate players of American football
American expatriate sportspeople in Sweden